Danielle Carter may refer to:

 Danielle Carter (actress), Australian actress
 Danielle Carter (footballer) (born 1993), English footballer
 Danielle Carter, a victim of the 1992 IRA bombing of the Baltic Exchange

See also 
 Daniel Carter (disambiguation)